

Susanoo (historical orthography:) is a  in Japanese mythology. The younger brother of Amaterasu, goddess of the sun and mythical ancestress of the Japanese imperial line, he is a multifaceted deity with contradictory characteristics (both good and bad), being portrayed in various stories either as a wild, impetuous god associated with the sea and storms, as a heroic figure who killed a monstrous serpent, or as a local deity linked with the harvest and agriculture. Syncretic beliefs that arose after the introduction of Buddhism to Japan also saw Susanoo becoming conflated with deities of pestilence and disease.

One of the gazetteer reports commissioned by the imperial court during the same period these texts were written, that of Izumo Province (modern Shimane Prefecture) in western Japan, also contains a number of short legends concerning Susanoo or his children, suggesting a connection between the god and this region.

In addition, a few other myths also hint at a connection between Susanoo and the Korean Peninsula.

Name 

The  in Susanoo's name has been variously explained as being derived from either of the following words:

The verb  or   meaning 'to be impetuous,' 'to be violent,' or 'to go wild'
The verb , 'to advance'
A word related to the Middle Korean , meaning 'master' or 'shaman'

Mythology

Parentage 

Amaterasu was born when Izanagi washed his left eye, Tsukuyomi was born when he washed his right eye, and Susanoo was born when he washed his nose. Izanagi then appoints Amaterasu to rule , Tsukuyomi the night, and Susanoo the seas. Susanoo, who missed his mother, kept crying and howling incessantly until his beard grew long, causing the mountains to wither and the rivers to dry up. An angry Izanagi then "expelled him with a divine expulsion."
The main narrative of the  has Izanagi and Izanami procreating after creating the Japanese archipelago; to them were born (in the following order) Amaterasu, Tsukuyomi, the 'leech-child' Hiruko, and Susanoo. Susanoo, whose wailing laid waste to the land, was expelled and sent to the netherworld (Ne-no-Kuni).
A variant legend recorded in the  has Izanagi begetting Amaterasu by holding a bronze mirror in his left hand, Tsukuyomi by holding another mirror in his right hand, and Susanoo by turning his head and looking sideways. Susanoo is here also said to be banished by Izanagi due to his destructive nature.
A third variant in the  has Izanagi and Izanami begetting Amaterasu, Tsukuyomi, Hiruko, and Susanoo, as in the main narrative. This version specifies the Rock-Camphor Boat on which Hiruko was placed in to be the couple's fourth offspring. The fifth child, the fire god Kagutsuchi, caused the death of Izanami (as in the ). As in other versions, Susanoo – who "was of a wicked nature, and was always fond of wailing and wrath" – is here expelled by his parents.

Susanoo and Amaterasu 

Before Susanoo leaves, he ascends to Takamagahara, wishing to say farewell to his sister Amaterasu. As he did so, the mountains and rivers shook and the land quaked. Amaterasu, suspicious of his motives, went out to meet him dressed in male clothing and clad in armor, but when Susanoo proposed a trial by pledge to prove his sincerity, she accepted. In the ritual, the two gods each chewed and spat out an object carried by the other (in some variants, an item they each possessed).

Three goddesses – Takiribime (Tagorihime), Ichikishimahime, and Tagitsuhime – were thus born. Susanoo then took the strings of  beads Amaterasu entwined in her hair and round her wrists, likewise chewed the beads and spat them out. Five male deities – Ame-no-Oshihomimi, Ame-no-Hohi, Amatsuhikone, Ikutsuhikone, and Kumano-no-Kusubi – then came into existence.
Another variant account in the  has Susanoo meet a  named  on his way to heaven. This deity presented him with the  beads used in the ritual. In this version, Amaterasu begets the three goddesses after chewing the  beads Susanoo obtained earlier, while Susanoo begets the five gods after biting off the edge of Amaterasu's sword.
A third variant has Amaterasu chewing three different swords to beget the three goddesses as in the first variant. Susanoo, in turn, begat six male deities after chewing the magatama beads on his hair bunches and necklace and spitting them on his hands, forearms, and legs.

Amaterasu declares that the male deities were hers because they were born of her necklace, and that the three goddesses were Susanoo's. Susanoo, announcing that he had won the trial, thus signifying the purity of his intentions, "raged with victory" and proceeded to wreak havoc by destroying his sister's rice fields, defecating in her palace and flaying the 'heavenly piebald horse' (天斑駒, ame-no-fuchikoma), which he then hurled at Amaterasu's loom, killing one of her weaving maidens. A furious Amaterasu in response hid inside the Ama-no-Iwato ("Heavenly Rock Cave"), plunging heaven and earth into total darkness. The gods, led by Omoikane-no-Kami (思金神), eventually persuade her to come out of the cave, restoring light to the world. As punishment for his misdeeds, Susanoo is thrown out of Takamagahara:

A fourth variant of the story in the Shoki reverses the order of the two events. This version relates that Susanoo and Amaterasu each owned three rice fields; Amaterasu's fields were fertile, while Susanoo's were dry and barren. Driven by jealousy, Susanoo ruins his sister's rice fields, causing her to hide in the Ama-no-Iwato and him to be expelled from heaven (as above). During his banishment, Susanoo, wearing a hat and a raincoat made of straw, sought shelter from the heavy rains, but the other gods refused to give him lodging. He then ascends to heaven once more to say farewell to Amaterasu.

The two then perform the ukehi ritual; Susanoo produces six male deities from the magatama beads on his hair knots. Declaring that his intentions were indeed pure, Susanoo gives the six gods to Amaterasu's care and departs.

Susanoo and Ōgetsuhime 
The Kojiki relates that during his banishment, Susanoo asked the goddess of food, Ōgetsuhime-no-Kami (大気都比売神), to give him something to eat. Upon finding out that the goddess produced foodstuffs from her mouth, nose, and rectum, a disgusted Susanoo killed her, at which various crops, plants and seeds spring from her dead body. This account is not found in the Nihon Shoki, where a similar story is told of Tsukuyomi and the goddess Ukemochi.

Slaying the Yamata no Orochi 

After his banishment, Susanoo came down from heaven to Ashihara-no-Nakatsukuni (葦原中国, the 'Central Land of Reed Plains', i.e. the earthly land of Japan), to the land of Izumo, where he met an elderly couple named Ashinazuchi (足名椎 / 脚摩乳) and Tenazuchi (手名椎 / 手摩乳), who told him that seven of their eight daughters had been devoured by a monstrous serpent known as the Yamata no Orochi (八俣遠呂智 / 八岐大蛇, "eight-forked serpent") and it was nearing time for their eighth, Kushinadahime (櫛名田比売; also called Kushiinadahime, Inadahime, or Makami-Furu-Kushiinadahime in the Shoki).

Sympathizing with their plight, Susanoo hid Kushinadahime by transforming her into a comb (kushi), which he placed in his hair. He then made the serpent drunk on strong sake and then killed it as it lay in a drunken stupor. From within the serpent's tail Susanoo discovered the sword Ame-no-Murakumo-no-Tsurugi (天叢雲剣, "Sword of the Gathering Clouds of Heaven"), also known as Kusanagi-no-Tsurugi (草薙剣, "Grass-Cutting Sword"), which he then presented to Amaterasu as a reconciliatory gift.

Amaterasu later bequeathed the sword to Ninigi, her grandson by Ame-no-Oshihomimi, along with the mirror Yata no Kagami and the jewel Yasakani no Magatama. This sacred sword, mirror, and jewel collectively became the three Imperial Regalia of Japan.

While most accounts place Susanoo's descent in the headwaters of the river Hi in Izumo (肥河 / 簸之川, Hi-no-Kawa, identified with the Hii River in modern Shimane Prefecture), with the Kojiki specifying the area to be a place called Torikami (鳥髮, identified with Mount Sentsū in eastern Shimane), one variant in the Shoki instead has Susanoo descend to the upper reaches of the river E (可愛之川, E-no-kawa) in the province of Aki (identified with the Gōnokawa River in modern Hiroshima Prefecture). Kushinadahime's parents are here given the names Ashinazu-Tenazu (脚摩手摩) and Inada-no-Miyanushi-Susa-no-Yatsumimi (稲田宮主簀狭之八箇耳); here, Kushinadahime is not yet born when Susanoo slew the Yamata no Orochi.

The ten-span sword Susanoo used to slay the Yamata no Orochi, unnamed in the Kojiki and the Shoki's main text, is variously named in the Shoki's variants as Orochi-no-Aramasa (蛇之麁正, 'Rough [and] True [Blade] of the Serpent'), Orochi-no-Karasabi-no-Tsurugi (蛇韓鋤之剣, 'Korean (Kara) Sword of the Serpent' or 'Flashing Sword of the Serpent'), and Ame-no-Haekiri-no-Tsurugi (天蝿斫剣, 'Heavenly Fly Cutter', also Ame-no-Hahakiri 'Heavenly Serpent (haha) Cutter'). In the Kogo Shūi it is dubbed Ame-no-Habakiri (天羽々斬, also Ame-no-Hahakiri). This sword is said to have been originally enshrined in Isonokami Futsumitama Shrine in Bizen Province (modern Okayama Prefecture) before it was transferred to Isonokami Shrine in Yamato Province (modern Nara Prefecture).

Susanoo in Soshimori 

A variant account in the Shoki relates that after Susanoo was banished due to his bad behavior, he descended from heaven, accompanied by a son named Isotakeru-no-Mikoto (五十猛命), to a place called 'Soshimori' (曽尸茂梨) in the land of Shiragi (the Korean kingdom of Silla) before going to Izumo. Disliking the place, they crossed the sea in a boat made of clay until they arrived at Torikami Peak (鳥上之峯, Torikami no mine) by the upper waters of the river Hi in Izumo.

The palace of Suga 
After slaying the Yamata no Orochi, Susanoo looked for a suitable place in Izumo to live in. Upon arriving at a place called Suga (須賀 / 清), he declared, "Coming to this place, my heart is refreshed (sugasugashi)." He then erected a palace there and made a song:

Donald L. Philippi (1968) translates the song into English thus:

The Kojiki adds that Susanoo appointed Kushinadahime's father Ashinazuchi to be the headman of his new dwelling, bestowing upon him the name Inada-no-Miyanushi-Suga-no-Yatsumimi-no-Kami (稲田宮主須賀之八耳神, 'Master of the Palace of Inada, the Eight-Eared Deity of Suga'). With his new wife Kushinadahime, Susanoo had a child named Yashimajinumi-no-Kami (八島士奴美神). He then took another wife named Kamu-Ōichihime (神大市比売), the daughter of Ōyamatsumi, the god of mountains, and had two children by her: Ōtoshi-no-Kami (大年神), the god of the harvest, and Ukanomitama-no-Kami (宇迦之御魂神), the god of agriculture.

The Shoki's main narrative is roughly similar: Susanoo appoints Ashinazuchi and Tenazuchi to be the keepers of his palace and gives them the title Inada-no-Miyanushi. The child born to Susanoo and Kushiinadahime in this version is identified as Ōnamuchi-no-Kami (大己貴神, the Kojiki's Ōkuninushi).

After having thus lived for a time in Izumo, Susanoo at length finally found his way to Ne-no-Kuni.

Planting trees 
One variant in the Shoki has Susanoo pulling out hairs from different parts of his body and turning them into different kinds of trees. Determining the use of each, he then gives them to his three children – Isotakeru-no-Mikoto, Ōyatsuhime-no-Mikoto (大屋津姫命), and Tsumatsuhime-no-Mikoto (枛津姫命) – to spread in Japan. Susanoo then settled down in a place called Kumanari-no-Take (熊成峯) before going to Ne-no-Kuni.

The myth of Susanoo's descent in Soshimori has Isotakeru bringing seeds with him from Takamagahara which he did not choose to plant in Korea but rather spread throughout Japan, beginning with Tsukushi Province. The narrative adds that it is, for this reason, why Isotakeru is styled Isaoshi-no-Kami (有功之神, 'Meritorious Deity').

Susanoo and Ōnamuji 

In the Kojiki, a sixth-generation descendant of Susanoo, Ōnamuji-no-Kami (大穴牟遅神), ends up in Ne-no-Kuni to escape his wicked elder brothers who make repeated attempts on his life. There he meets and falls in love with Susanoo's daughter Suseribime (須勢理毘売). Upon learning of their affair, Susanoo imposes four trials on Ōnamuji:

Susanoo, upon inviting Ōnamuji to his dwelling, had him sleep in a chamber filled with snakes. Suseribime aided Ōnamuji by giving him a scarf that repelled the snakes.
The following night, Susanoo had Ōnamuji sleep in another room full of centipedes and bees. Once again, Suseribime gave Ōnamuji a scarf that kept the insects at bay.
Susanoo shot an arrow into a large plain and had Ōnamuji fetch it. As Ōnamuji was busy looking for the arrow, Susanoo set the field on fire. A field mouse showed Ōnamuji how to hide from the flames and gave him the arrow he was searching for.
Susanoo, upon discovering that Ōnamuji had survived, summoned him back to his palace and had him pick the lice and centipedes from his hair. Using a mixture of red clay and nuts given to him by Suseribime, Ōnamuji pretended to chew and spit out the insects he was picking.

After Susanoo was lulled to sleep, Ōnamuji tied Susanoo's hair to the hall's rafters and blocked the door with an enormous boulder. Taking his new wife Suseribime as well as Susanoo's sword, koto, and bow and arrows with him, Ōnamuji thus fled the palace. The koto brushed against a tree as the two were fleeing; the sound awakens Susanoo, who, rising with a start, knocks his palace down around him. Susanoo then pursued them as far as the slopes of Yomotsu Hirasaka (黄泉比良坂, the 'Flat Slope of Yomi'). As the two departed, Susanoo grudgingly gave his blessing to Ōnamuji, advising him to change his name to Ōkuninushi-no-Kami (大国主神, "Master of the Great Land"). Using the weapons he obtained from Susanoo, Ōkuninushi defeats his brothers and becomes the undisputed ruler of Ashihara-no-Nakatsukuni.

Susanoo in the Izumo Fudoki 

The Fudoki of Izumo Province (completed 733 CE) records the following etiological legends which feature Susanoo and his children:

The township of Yasuki (安来郷) in Ou District (意宇郡) is named such after Susanoo visited the area and said, "My mind has been comforted (yasuku nari tamau)."
The township of Ōkusa (大草郷) in Ou is said to have been named after a son of Susanoo named Aohata-Sakusahiko-no-Mikoto (青幡佐久佐比古命).
The township of Yamaguchi (山口郷) in Shimane District (島根郡) is named as such after another son of Susanoo, Tsurugihiko-no-Mikoto (都留支日子命), declared these entrance to the hills (yamaguchi) to be his territory.
The township of Katae (方結郷) in Shimane received its name after Kunioshiwake-no-Mikoto (国忍別命), a son of Susanoo, said, "The land I govern is in good condition geographically (kunigatae)."
The township of Etomo (恵曇郡) in Akika District (秋鹿郡) is named such after Susanoo's son Iwasakahiko-no-Mikoto (磐坂日子命) noted the area's resemblance to a painted arm guard (画鞆, etomo).
The township of Tada (多太郷) in Akika District received its name after Susanoo's son Tsukihoko-Tooruhiko-no-Mikoto (衝杵等乎留比古命, also Tsukiki-Tooruhiko) came there and said, "My heart has become bright and truthful (tadashi)."
The township of Yano (八野郷) in Kando District (神門郡) is named after Susanoo's daughter Yanowakahime-no-Mikoto (八野若日女命), who lived in the area. Ōnamochi (大穴持命, i.e. Ōkuninushi), also known as Ame-no-Shita-Tsukurashishi-Ōkami (所造天下大神, 'Great Deity, Maker of All Under Heaven'), who wished to marry her, had a house built at this place.
The township of Namesa (滑狭郷) in Kando District (神門郡) is named after a smooth stone (滑磐石, nameshi iwa) Ame-no-Shita-Tsukurashishi-Ōkami (Ōnamochi) spotted while visiting Susanoo's daughter Wakasuserihime-no-Mikoto (和加須世理比売命, the Kojiki's Suseribime), who is said to have lived there.
The township of Susa (須佐郷) in Iishi District (飯石郡) is said to be named after Susanoo, who enshrined his spirit in this place:

The township of Sase (佐世郷) in Ōhara District (大原郡) is said to have gained its name when Susanoo danced there wearing leaves of a plant called sase on his head.
Mount Mimuro (御室山, Mimuro-yama) in the township of Hi (斐伊郷) in Ōhara District is said to have been the place where Susanoo built a temporary dwelling (御室, mimuro, lit. 'noble chamber') in which he stayed the night.

Susanoo, Mutō Tenjin and Gozu Tennō 

The syncretic deity Gozu Tennō (牛頭天王, "Ox-Headed Heavenly King"), originally worshiped at Yasaka Shrine in Kyoto and at other shrines such as Tsushima Shrine in Aichi Prefecture, was historically conflated with Susanoo. Originally a deity of foreign import (India and Korea have all been suggested as possible origins), Gozu Tennō was widely revered since the Heian period as a god of pestilence, who both caused disease and cured them.

Gozu Tennō became associated with another deity called Mutō-no-Kami (武塔神) or Mutō Tenjin (武塔天神), who appears in the legend of Somin Shōrai (蘇民将来). This legend relates that Mutō, a god from the northern sea, embarked on a long journey to court the daughter of the god of the southern seas. On his way he sought lodging from a wealthy man, but was turned down. He then went to the home of a poor man (sometimes identified as the rich man's brother) named Somin Shōrai, who gave him food and shelter. Years later, Mutō returned and slew the rich man and his family but spared Somin Shōrai's house. Some versions of the story have Mutō repaying Somin Shōrai for his hospitality by giving the poor man's daughter a wreath of susuki (Miscanthus sinensis) reeds that she is to wear while declaring, "[I am] the descendant of Somin Shōrai" (蘇民将来之子孫也, Somin Shōrai no shison nari). By doing so, she and her descendants would be spared from pestilence. The deity in this story, Mutō,  is often conflated with Gozu Tennō (who, as his name implies, was born with the head of an ox) in later retellings, though one version identifies Gozu Tennō as Mutō Tenjin's son.

The earliest known version of this legend, found in the Fudoki of Bingo Province (modern eastern Hiroshima Prefecture) compiled during the Nara period (preserved in an extract quoted by scholar and Shinto priest Urabe Kanekata in the Shaku Nihongi), has Mutō explicitly identify himself as Susanoo. This suggests that Susanoo and Mutō Tenjin were already conflated in the Nara period, if not earlier. Sources that equate Gozu Tennō with Susanoo only first appear during the Kamakura period (1185–1333), although one theory supposes that these three gods and various other disease-related deities were already loosely coalesced around the 9th century, probably around the year 877 when a major epidemic swept through Japan.

Analysis 

The image of Susanoo that can be gleaned from various texts is rather complex and contradictory. In the Kojiki and the Shoki he is portrayed first as a petulant young man, then as an unpredictable, violent boor who causes chaos and destruction before turning into a monster-slaying culture hero after descending into the world of men, while in the Izumo Fudoki, he is simply a local god apparently connected with rice fields, with almost none of the traits associated with him in the imperial mythologies being mentioned. Due to his multifaceted nature, various authors have had differing opinions regarding Susanoo's origins and original character.

The Edo period kokugaku scholar Motoori Norinaga, in his Kojiki-den (Commentary on the Kojiki), characterized Susanoo as an evil god in contrast to his elder siblings Amaterasu and Tsukuyomi, as the unclean air of the land of the dead still adhered to Izanagi's nose from which he was born and was not purified completely during Izanagi's ritual ablutions. The early 20th century historian Tsuda Sōkichi, who put forward the then-controversial theory that the Kojiki's accounts were not based on history (as Edo period kokugaku and State Shinto ideology believed them to be) but rather propagandistic myths concocted to explain and legitimize the rule of the imperial (Yamato) dynasty, also saw Susanoo as a negative figure, arguing that he was created to serve as the rebellious opposite of the imperial ancestress Amaterasu. Ethnologist Ōbayashi Taryō, speaking from the standpoint of comparative mythology, opined that the stories concerning the three deities were ultimately derived from a continental (Southeast Asian) myth in which the Sun, the Moon and the Dark Star are siblings and the Dark Star plays an antagonistic role (cf. Rahu and Ketu from Hindu mythology); Ōbayashi thus also interprets Susanoo as a bad hero.

Other scholars, however, take the position that Susanoo was not originally conceived of as a negative deity. Mythologist Matsumura Takeo for instance believed the Izumo Fudoki to more accurately reflect Susanoo's original character: a peaceful, simple kami of the rice fields. In Matsumura's view, Susanoo's character was deliberately reversed when he was grafted into the imperial mythology by the compilers of the Kojiki. Matsumoto Nobuhiro, in a similar vein, interpreted Susanoo as a harvest deity. While the Izumo Fudoki claims that the township of Susa in Izumo is named after its deity Susanoo, it has been proposed that the opposite might have actually been the case and Susanoo was named after the place, with his name being understood in this case as meaning "Man (o) of Susa."

While both Matsumura and Matsumoto preferred to connect Susanoo with rice fields and the harvest, Matsumae Takeshi put forward the theory that Susanoo was originally worshiped as a patron deity of sailors. Unlike other scholars who connect Susanoo with Izumo, Matsumae instead saw Kii Province (the modern prefectures of Wakayama and Mie) as the birthplace of Susanoo worship, pointing out that there was also a settlement in Kii named Susa (須佐). (In the Kojiki, Ōnamuji enters Susanoo's realm, Ne-no-Kuni, through the fork of a tree in Kii.) Matsumae proposed that the worship of Susanoo was brought to other places in Japan by seafaring peoples from Kii, a land rich in timber (the province's name is itself derived from the word ki meaning 'tree').

A few myths, such as that of Susanoo's descent in Soshimori in Silla, seem to suggest a connection between the god and the Korean Peninsula. Indeed, some scholars have hypothesized that the deities who were eventually conflated with Susanoo, Mutō Tenjin, and Gozu Tennō, may have had Korean origins as well, with the name 'Mutō' (武塔, historical orthography: mutau) being linked with the Korean word mudang "shamaness," and 'Gozu' being explained as a calque of 'Soshimori', here interpreted as being derived from a Korean toponym meaning 'Bull's (so) Head (mari)'. The name 'Susanoo' itself has been interpreted as being related to the Middle Korean title susung (transliterated as 次次雄 or 慈充), meaning 'master' or 'shaman', notably applied to Namhae, the second king of Silla, in the Samguk Sagi. Susanoo is thus supposed in this view to have originally been a foreign god (蕃神, banshin), perhaps a deified shaman, whose origins may be traced back to Korea.

Emilia Gadeleva (2000) sees Susanoo's original character as being that of a rain god – more precisely, a god associated with rainmaking – with his association with the harvest and a number of other elements from his myths ultimately springing from his connection with rainwater. He thus serves as a contrast and a parallel to Amaterasu, the goddess of the sun. Gadeleva also acknowledges the foreign elements in the god's character by supposing that rainmaking rituals and concepts were brought to Japan in ancient times from the continent, with the figure of the Korean shaman (susung) who magically controlled the abundance of rain eventually morphing into the Japanese Susanoo, but at the same time stresses that Susanoo is not completely a foreign import but must have had Japanese roots at his core. In Gadeleva's view, while the god certainly underwent drastic changes upon his introduction in the imperial myth cycle, Susanoo's character already bore positive and negative features since the beginning, with both elements stemming from his association with rain. As the right quantity of rainwater was vital for ensuring a rich harvest, calamities caused by too much or too little rainfall (i.e. floods, drought, or epidemics) would have been blamed on the rain god for not doing his job properly. This, according to Gadeleva, underlies the occasional portrayal of Susanoo in a negative light.

Susanoo and Ne-no-Kuni 
In the Kojiki and the Nihon Shoki, Susanoo is repeatedly associated with Ne-no-Kuni (Japanese: 根の国; the "Land of Roots"). While sometimes seemingly considered to be more or less identical to Yomi, the Land of the Dead (the Kojiki speaks of Ne-no-Kuni as the land of Susanoo's deceased mother Izanami, who is stated earlier in the narrative to have become the ruler of Yomi, and calls the slope serving at its exit the Yomotsu Hirasaka, the 'Flat Slope of Yomi'), it would seem that the two were originally considered to be different locations.

While Matsumura Takeo suggested that Ne-no-Kuni originally referred to the dimly remembered original homeland of the Japanese people, Emilia Gadeleva instead proposes that the two locales, while similar in that both were subterranean realms associated with darkness, differed from each other in that Yomi was associated with death, while Ne-no-Kuni, as implied by the myth about Ōnamuji, was seemingly associated with rebirth. Ne-no-Kuni being a land of revival, as per Gadeleva's theory, is why Susanoo was connected to it: Susanoo, as the god that brought rain and with it, the harvest, was needed in Ne-no-Kuni to secure the rebirth of crops. In time, however, the two locations were confused with each other, so that by the time the Kojiki and the Shoki were written Ne-no-Kuni came to be seen like Yomi as an unclean realm of the dead. Gadeleva argues that this new image of Ne-no-Kuni as a place of evil and impurity contributed to Susanoo becoming more and more associated with calamity and violence.

Susanoo's rampage 

Susanoo's acts of violence after proving his sincerity in the ukehi ritual has been a source of puzzlement to many scholars. While Edo period authors such as Motoori Norinaga and Hirata Atsutane believed that the order of the events had become confused and suggested altering the narrative sequence so that Susanoo's ravages would come before, and not after, his victory in the ukehi, Donald Philippi criticized such solutions as "untenable from a textual standpoint." (Note that as mentioned above, one of the variants in the Shoki does place Susanoo's ravages and banishment before the performance of the ukehi ritual.)

Tsuda Sōkichi saw a political significance in this story: he interpreted Amaterasu as an emperor-symbol, while Susanoo in his view symbolized the various rebels who (unsuccessfully) rose up against the Yamato court.

Emilia Gadeleva observes that Susanoo, at this point in the narrative, is portrayed similarly to the hero Yamato Takeru (Ousu-no-Mikoto), in that both were rough young men possessed with "valor and ferocity" (takeku-araki kokoro); their lack of control over their fierce temperament leads them to commit violent acts. It was therefore imperative to direct their energies elsewhere: Ousu-no-Mikoto was sent by his father, the Emperor Keikō, to lead conquering expeditions, while Susanoo was expelled by the heavenly gods. This ultimately resulted in the two becoming famed as heroic figures.

A prayer or norito originally recited by the priestly Nakatomi clan in the presence of the court during the Great Exorcism (大祓, Ōharae) ritual of the last day of the sixth month, more commonly known today as the Ōharae no Kotoba (大祓詞, 'Words of the Great Exorcism'), lists eight "heavenly sins" (Japanese: 天つ罪, amatsu-tsumi), most of which are agricultural in nature:

 Breaking down the ridges
 Covering up the ditches
 Releasing the irrigation sluices
 Double planting
 Setting up stakes
 Skinning alive
 Skinning backward
 Defecation

1, 2, 6, 7 and 8 are committed by Susanoo in the Kojiki, while 3, 4, 5 are attributed to him in the Shoki. In ancient Japanese society, offenses related to agriculture were regarded as abhorrent as those that caused ritual impurity.

One of the offensive acts Susanoo committed during his rampage was 'skinning backward' (逆剥, sakahagi) the Ame-no-Fuchikoma (Japanese: 天の斑駒, "Heavenly-Piebald Horse"). Regarding this, William George Aston observed, "Indian myth has a piebald or spotted deer or cow among celestial objects. The idea is probably suggested by the appearance of the stars." Nelly Naumann (1982) meanwhile interpreted the spotted horse as a lunar symbol, with Susanoo's action being equivalent to the devouring or killing of the moon. To Naumann, the act of flaying itself, because it is performed in reverse, is intended to be a magical act that caused death. Indeed, in the Kojiki when Susanoo throws the flayed horse (or its hide) to Amaterasu's weaving hall, one of the weaving maidens injures herself and dies. (In the Shoki, it is Amaterasu herself who is alarmed and injured.) Emilia Gadeleva meanwhile connects Susanoo's act of skinning and flinging the horse with ancient Korean rainmaking rituals, which involved animal sacrifice.

The gods punish Susanoo for his rampages by cutting off his beard, fingernails, and toenails. One textual tradition in which the relevant passage is read as "cutting off his beard and causing the nails of his hands and feet to be extracted" (亦切鬚及手足爪令拔而) suggests that this was something along the lines of corporal punishment. Another tradition which reads the passage as "cutting off his beard and the nails of his hands and feet, had him exorcised" (亦切鬚及手足爪令祓而) meanwhile suggests that this was an act of purification, in which the sins and pollution that adhered to Susanoo are removed, thus turning him from a destroyer of life into a giver of life.

Family

Consorts 

Susanoo's consorts are:

Kushinadahime (櫛名田比売), daughter of Ashinazuchi and Tenazuchi, children of Ōyamatsumi, a son of Izanagi and elder brother of Susanoo (Kojiki, Nihon Shoki)
Also known under the following names:
Kushiinadahime (奇稲田姫, Nihon Shoki)
Inadahime (稲田媛, Shoki)
Makami-Furu-Kushiinadahime (真髪触奇稲田媛, Shoki)
Kushiinada-Mitoyomanurahime-no-Mikoto (久志伊奈太美等与麻奴良比売命, Izumo Fudoki)
Kamu-Ōichihime (神大市比売), another daughter of Ōyamatsumi (Kojiki)
Samirahime-no-Mikoto (佐美良比売命), a goddess worshiped in Yasaka Shrine reckoned as a consort of Susanoo

Offspring 
Susanoo's child by Kushinadahime is variously identified as Yashimajinumi-no-Kami (八島士奴美神) in the Kojiki and as Ōnamuchi-no-Kami (大己貴神) in the Nihon Shoki's main narrative. (In the Kojiki and in variant accounts contained in the Shoki, Ōnamuchi / Ōnamuji (Ōkuninushi) is instead Susanoo's descendant.)

Susanoo's children by Kamu-Ōichihime meanwhile are:

 Ōtoshi-no-Kami (大年神)
 Ukanomitama-no-Kami (宇迦之御魂神)

Susanoo's children who are either born without a female partner or whose mother is unidentified are:

 The Munakata goddesses of Munakata Taisha in Munakata, Fukuoka Prefecture
 Takiribime-no-Mikoto (多紀理毘売命)
Also known as Tagorihime (田心姫)
 Ichikishimahime-no-Mikoto (市寸島比売命)
Also known as Okitsushimahime (瀛津島姫)
 Tagitsuhime-no-Mikoto (多岐都比売命)
 Suseribime-no-Mikoto (須勢理毘売命)
Also known as Wakasuserihime-no-Mikoto (和加須世理比売命) in the Izumo Fudoki
 Isotakeru / Itakeru-no-Mikoto (五十猛命)
 Ōyatsuhime-no-Mikoto (大屋津姫命)
 Tsumatsuhime-no-Mikoto (枛津姫命)

Deities identified as Susanoo's children found only in the Izumo Fudoki are:

 Kunioshiwake-no-Mikoto (国忍別命)
 Aohata-Sakusahiko-no-Mikoto (青幡佐草日古命)
 Iwasakahiko-no-Mikoto (磐坂日子命)
 Tsukihoko-Tooruhiko-no-Mikoto (衝桙等番留比古命)
 Tsurugihiko-no-Mikoto  (都留支日子命)
 Yanowakahime-no-Mikoto (八野若日女命)

An Edo period text, the Wakan Sansai Zue (和漢三才図会, lit. "Illustrated Sino-Japanese Encyclopedia"), identifies a monstrous goddess known as Ama-no-Zako (天逆毎) as an offspring of Susanoo.

Worship 
In addition to his connections with the sea and tempests, due to his mythical role as the slayer of the Yamata no Orochi and his historical association with pestilence deities such as Gozu Tennō, Susanoo is also venerated as a god who wards off misfortune and calamity, being invoked especially against illness and disease. As his heroic act helped him win the hand of Kushinadahime, he is also considered to be a patron of love and marriage, such as in Hikawa Shrine in Saitama Prefecture (see below).

Shrines 

Susanoo is worshiped in a number of shrines throughout Japan, especially in Shimane Prefecture (the eastern part of which is the historical Izumo Province). A few notable examples are:

 Susa Shrine (須佐神社) in Izumo, Shimane Prefecture
Listed in the Izumo Fudoki as one of five shrines in Iishi District that were registered with the Department of Divinities, this shrine is identified as the place in what was formerly the township of Susa where Susanoo chose to enshrine his spirit. The shrine was also known as Jūsansho Daimyōjin (十三所大明神) and Susa no Ōmiya (須佐大宮 'Great Shrine of Susa') during the medieval and early modern periods. The shrine's priestly lineage, the Susa (or Inada) clan (須佐氏 / 稲田氏), were considered to be the descendants of Susanoo via his son Yashimashino-no-Mikoto (八島篠命, the Kojiki's Yashimajinumi-no-Kami) or Ōkuninushi. Besides Susanoo, his consort Kushinadahime and her parents Ashinazuchi and Tenazuchi are also enshrined here as auxiliary deities.
 Suga Shrine (須我神社) in Unnan, Shimane Prefecture
This shrine, claimed to stand on the site of the palace Susanoo built after defeating the Yamata no Orochi, enshrines Susanoo, Kushinadahime, and their son Suga-no-Yuyamanushi-Minasarohiko-Yashima-no-Mikoto (清之湯山主三名狭漏彦八島野命, i.e. Yashimajinumi-no-Kami). Listed in the Izumo Fudoki as one of sixteen shrines in Ōhara District not registered with the Department of Divinities.
 Yaegaki Shrine (八重垣神社), in Matsue, Shimane Prefecture
Dedicated to Susanoo, Kushinadahime, Ōnamuchi (Ōkuninushi) and Aohata-Sakusahiko, the shrine takes its name from the 'eightfold fence' (yaegaki) mentioned in Susanoo's song. The shrine's legend claims that Susanoo hid Kushinadahime in the forest within the shrine's precincts, enclosing her in a fence, when he slew the Yamata no Orochi. Identified with the Sakusa Shrine (佐久佐社) mentioned in the Izumo Fudoki.
 Kumano Taisha (熊野大社) in Matsue, Shimane Prefecture
Reckoned as Izumo Province's ichinomiya alongside Izumo Grand Shrine. Not to be confused with the Kumano Sanzan shrine complex in Wakayama Prefecture. Its deity, known under the name 'Izanagi-no-Himanago Kaburogi Kumano-no-Ōkami Kushimikenu-no-Mikoto' (伊邪那伎日真名子加夫呂伎熊野大神櫛御気野命, "Beloved Child of Izanagi, Divine Ancestor [and] Great Deity of Kumano, Kushimikenu-no-Mikoto'), is identified with Susanoo. The shrine is also considered in myth to be where the use of fire originated; two ancient fire-making tools, a hand drill (燧杵 hikiri-kine) and a hearthboard (燧臼 hikiri-usu) are kept in the shrine and used in the shrine's Fire Lighting Ceremony (鑚火祭 Kiribi-matsuri or Sanka-sai) held every October.
 Susa Shrine (須佐神社) in Arida, Wakayama Prefecture

The following shrines were originally associated with Gozu Tennō:

 Yasaka Shrine (八坂神社) in Gion, Higashiyama, Kyoto, Kyoto Prefecture – Head shrine of the Yasaka shrine network
 Tsushima Shrine (津島神社) in Tsushima, Aichi Prefecture – Head shrine of the Tsushima shrine network
 Hiromine Shrine (広峰神社) in Himeji, Hyōgo Prefecture

The Hikawa Shrine network concentrated in Saitama and Tokyo (historical Musashi Province) also has Susanoo as its focus of worship, often alongside Kushinadahime.

Hikawa Shrine (氷川神社) in Ōmiya, Saitama, Saitama Prefecture
Hikawa Shrine in Kawagoe, Saitama Prefecture
Hikawa Shrine in Akasaka, Minato, Tokyo

Susanoo Shrine in Hamamatsu, Shizuoka Prefecture

In Japanese performing arts 

The iwami kagura – Orochi
The jōruri – Nihon Furisode Hajime by Chikamatsu Monzaemon

Influence outside of Japan 

In the 20th century, Susanoo was depicted as the common ancestor of the modern Koreans while the Japanese were considered to be descendants of Amaterasu during the Japanese occupation of Korea by historians such as Shiratori Kurakichi, founder of the discipline of Oriental History (Tōyōshi 東洋史) in Tokyo Imperial University.

The theory linked the Koreans to Susanoo and in turn the Japanese which ultimately legitimized the colonization of the Korean peninsula by the Japanese.

In popular culture 
Yamata Amasung Keibu Keioiba is a Meitei language play that interweaves the stories of the two legendary creatures, Yamata-no-Orochi slain by Susanoo of Japanese folklore and Keibu Keioiba of Meitei folklore (Manipuri folklore). In the play, the role of Susanoo was played by Romario Thoudam Paona.

Along with Yamato Takeru, he was portrayed by Toshiro Mifune in The Birth of Japan. The film suggests Susanoo's grief over Izanami and resentment towards Izanagi caused his violent rampage.

See also 
Izumo Province
Izanagi
Ama no Fuchigoma
Amaterasu
Kusanagi
Gion Matsuri

Notes

References

Bibliography 
Aoki, Michiko Y., tr. (1997). Records of Wind and Earth: A Translation of Fudoki, with Introduction and Commentaries. Association for Asian Studies, Inc. .
Aston, William George, tr. (1896). Nihongi: Chronicles of Japan from the Earliest Times to A.D. 697. 2 vols. Kegan Paul. 1972 Tuttle reprint.
Chamberlain, Basil H., tr. (1919). The Kojiki, Records of Ancient Matters. 1981 Tuttle reprint.

Philippi, Donald L. (2015). Kojiki. Princeton University Press. .

External links 

Susanoo, Encyclopedia of Shinto
Susano-O no Mikoto, Kimberley Winkelmann, in the Internet Archive as of 5 December 2008
Shaji Enza no Kai Organization
Official Website of Susa Shrine (in Japanese)
Official Website of Yasaka Shrine (in Japanese)
Official Website of Kumano Taisha (in Japanese)
Official Website of Hikawa Shrine (Saitama) (in Japanese)
Official Website of Akasaka Hikawa Shrine (in Japanese)
Susanoo vs Yamata no Orochi animated depiction

Dragonslayers
Japanese gods
Mythological swordfighters
War gods
Sea and river gods
Shinto kami
Sky and weather gods
Love and lust gods
Nature gods
Harvest gods
Fertility gods
Agricultural gods
Marriage deities
Trickster gods
Gion faith
Kunitsukami